Brooklyn Media, is the parent company of Bay Currents, a community newspaper of Brooklyn, New York, and the former owner of Brooklyn! which began in 2002. The company became Bay Currents, Inc. in December 2007.

Mass media companies based in New York City
Companies based in Brooklyn